Caitlin Clark (born January 22, 2002) is an American college basketball player for the Iowa Hawkeyes of the Big Ten Conference.

At Dowling Catholic High School in West Des Moines, Iowa, Clark was among the top recruits in her class and named a McDonald's All-American. In her first season with Iowa, she led the NCAA Division I in scoring, shared national freshman of the year honors and was an All-American. As a sophomore, Clark was a unanimous first-team All-American and became the first women's player to lead the Division I in points and assists in a single season. She has won the Dawn Staley Award two times and the Nancy Lieberman Award one time as the top Division I player at her position.

Clark has won three gold medals representing the United States at the youth international level. She was named Most Valuable Player of the 2021 FIBA Under-19 Women's Basketball World Cup.

Early life
Clark was born on January 22, 2002, in Des Moines, Iowa, to Anne Nizzi-Clark and Brent Clark. Her mother is of Italian descent. Clark's father played basketball and baseball at Simpson College. She was raised in West Des Moines, Iowa, with an older brother, Blake, now a college football player at Iowa State; and a younger brother, Colin. Clark started playing basketball at age five and was the only girl on a boys youth team. She also played softball, volleyball, soccer and tennis as a child before focusing on basketball.

In sixth grade, Clark joined All Iowa Attack, an Amateur Athletic Union (AAU) basketball program based in Ames, Iowa, for whom she played until graduating from high school. She played against older opponents, facing high school seniors by eighth grade. Clark drew inspiration from Maya Moore of the Minnesota Lynx, the closest WNBA team to her hometown, and traveled with her father for 3  hours to see their games. She also looked up to her cousins, Haley and Audrey Faber, who played for Dowling Catholic High School in West Des Moines, and All Iowa Attack alumus Harrison Barnes.

High school career
Clark played four years of varsity basketball for Dowling Catholic High School under head coach Kristin Meyer. As a freshman, she averaged 15.3 points, 4.7 assists and 2.3 steals per game, earning Class 5A All-State second team accolades and leading her team to the state quarterfinals. In her sophomore season, Clark averaged 27.1 points, 6.5 rebounds, four assists and 2.3 steals, helping Dowling Catholic achieve a 20–4 record and return to the state quarterfinals. She ranked second in the state in scoring and was named to the Class 5A All-State first team.

As a junior, on February 4, 2019, Clark scored 60 points in a 90–78 win against Mason City High School, the second-best scoring output in Iowa five-on-five history. During the game, she broke the state single-game record with 13 three-pointers. She led Dowling Catholic to the state semifinals as the team finished with a 17–8 record. Clark was named Iowa Gatorade Player of the Year and repeated as a Class 5A All-State first team selection. As a senior, she averaged 33.4 points, eight rebounds, four assists and 2.7 steals per game, leading the state in scoring for a second time. Her team finished with a 19–4 record and reached the Class 5A regional final, where they were upset by Sioux City East High School. Clark finished her career with 2,547 points, the fourth-most in Iowa five-on-five history. She was awarded Iowa Gatorade Player of the Year, Des Moines Register All-Iowa Athlete of the Year, and Iowa Miss Basketball, while making the Class 5A All-State first team. Clark was selected to compete in the McDonald's All-American Game and the Jordan Brand Classic, but both games were canceled due to the COVID-19 pandemic.

During high school, Clark was AAU teammates with future Iowa State players Ashley and Aubrey Joens on the All Iowa Attack. She helped the team win the 2018 Nike Elite Youth Basketball League championship, and achieve runner-up finishes in 2017 and 2019. In her first two years at Dowling Catholic, Clark started on the school's varsity soccer team, but focused on basketball for her final two years.

Recruiting
Clark was recruited by NCAA Division I basketball programs before starting high school, receiving her first letter of interest from Missouri State before seventh grade. By her sophomore season at Dowling Catholic, she was ranked the number one player in the 2020 high school class by ESPN. At the end of her high school career, Clark was considered a five-star recruit and the fourth-best player in her class by ESPN. On November 12, 2019, she announced her commitment to play college basketball for Iowa over offers from Iowa State and Notre Dame. Clark was drawn to the team's up-tempo style of offense and head coach Lisa Bluder's development of point guards. She also expected to immediately have a key role on the team with the departure of Kathleen Doyle, the reigning Big Ten Player of the Year.

College career

Freshman season
Clark entered her freshman season as Iowa's starting point guard. On November 25, 2020, she made her collegiate debut, recording 27 points, eight rebounds and four assists in a 96–81 win over Northern Iowa. In her second game, on December 2, Clark posted her first double-double with 30 points and 13 assists in a 103–97 victory over Drake. On December 22, in a 92–65 victory over Western Illinois, she registered the first triple-double by an Iowa player since Samantha Logic did so in 2015. Despite shooting 3-of-15 from the field, Clark had 13 points, 13 rebounds and 10 assists during the game. On January 6, 2021, she recorded 37 points, 11 rebounds and four assists in a 92–79 win against Minnesota. Clark posted a season-high 39 points, 10 rebounds and seven assists in an 88–81 win over Nebraska on February 11, breaking the single-game scoring record for Pinnacle Bank Arena, the home venue of Nebraska. On February 28, she scored 18 points and had a season-high 14 assists in an 84–70 win over Wisconsin. At the end of the regular season, Clark was a unanimous Big Ten Freshman of the Year and first-team All-Big Ten selection. She was a 13-time Big Ten Freshman of the Week, setting a conference record, and led the Big Ten with five Player of the Week awards. 

Clark helped Iowa achieve a runner-up finish at the Big Ten tournament, where she was named to the all-tournament team and recorded 37 assists, the most in the event's history. In the second round of the NCAA tournament, she posted 35 points, seven rebounds and six assists in an 86–72 win over Kentucky. She broke program single-game records for points and three-pointers (6) in the tournament. Iowa reached the Sweet 16, where Clark scored 21 points in a 92–72 loss to first-seeded UConn. She was named a first-team All-American by the United States Basketball Writers Association (USBWA), a second-team All-American by the Associated Press (AP) and made the Women's Basketball Coaches Association (WBCA) Coaches' All-America team. Clark became the first freshman to win the Dawn Staley Award, which honors the best Division I guard. She shared two major Division I freshman of the year awards with Paige Bueckers of UConn: the Tamika Catchings Award, presented by the USBWA, and the WBCA Freshman of the Year award. As a freshman, Clark averaged 26.6 points, 7.1 assists, and 5.9 rebounds per game. She led the NCAA Division I in scoring and ranked second in assists and three-pointers per game. Her totals in points, assists, field goals and three-pointers also led the Division I. She set program freshman records for points and assists and had the fourth-highest scoring average in Iowa history.

Sophomore season

On November 9, 2021, Clark made her sophomore season debut, recording 26 points, eight rebounds and six assists in a 93–50 win over New Hampshire. On January 2, 2022, she posted 44 points and eight assists in a 93–56 win over Evansville. Clark broke the Carver-Hawkeye Arena women's single-game scoring record and surpassed Kelsey Mitchell of Ohio State as the fastest Big Ten player to reach 1,000 career points. On January 16, 2022, she recorded her fourth career triple-double, with 31 points, 10 rebounds and 10 assists in a 93–83 victory over Nebraska. In her next game, four days later, Clark posted 35 points, 13 rebounds and 11 assists in a 105–49 win over Minnesota. She became the first Division I men's or women's player to record consecutive triple-doubles with at least 30 points, and the first women's player in Big Ten history with consecutive triple-doubles. On January 25, Clark had 18 assists, which set program and conference single-game records, in addition to 20 points and seven rebounds in a 107–79 win against Penn State. On January 31, she recorded 43 points, seven assists and four rebounds in a 92–88 loss to Ohio State. On February 6, Clark scored a career-high 46 points, including 25 in the fourth quarter, and had 10 assists in a 98–90 loss to Michigan. She set the women's single-game scoring record for Crisler Center, the home arena of Michigan. After leading Iowa to a share of the Big Ten regular season title, she was unanimously named Big Ten Player of the Year and first-team All-Big Ten by the league's coaches and media.

On March 5, 2022, in the semifinals of the Big Ten tournament, Clark recorded 41 points and nine rebounds in an 83–66 win over Nebraska. She led Iowa to the title and was named tournament most outstanding player (MOP). Her team was upset by 10th-seeded Creighton in the second round of the NCAA tournament, where Clark was held to a season-low 15 points and 11 assists, shooting 4-of-19 from the field, in a 64–62 loss. She was a unanimous first-team All-American: she earned first-team All-American honors from the AP and the USBWA, and was a WBCA Coaches' All-America Team selection. Clark became the first back-to-back recipient of the Dawn Staley Award and won the Nancy Lieberman Award as the top Division I point guard. As a sophomore, she averaged 27 points, eight rebounds and eight assists per game. Clark was the first women's player to lead the Division I in points and assists per game in a single season. She also led the Division I in total points, free throws and triple-doubles. Clark was named a first-team Academic All-American by the College Sports Information Directors of America, since renamed College Sports Communicators (CSC).

Junior season
Entering her junior season, Clark was a unanimous selection for the AP preseason All-America team, and was named Big Ten preseason player of the year by the league's coaches and media. On November 18, 2022, she suffered an ankle injury with 3.8 seconds left in an 84–83 loss to Kansas State, where she recorded 27 points, 10 rebounds and seven assists. Listed as day-to-day, Clark played in Iowa's next game against Belmont on November 20, scoring 33 points in a 73–62 victory. On December 1, she scored a season-high 45 points in a 94–81 loss to NC State. Three days later, Clark posted her seventh career triple-double, with 22 points, 10 rebounds and 10 assists in a 102–71 win over Wisconsin. She surpassed Samantha Logic as the Big Ten career leader in triple-doubles. On December 21, in her 75th game, Clark tied Elena Delle Donne of Delaware as the fastest Division I women's player to reach 2,000 career points since the 1999–2000 season, scoring 20 points in a 92–54 win over Dartmouth. On January 23, 2023, Clark recorded 28 points, 15 assists and 10 rebounds in an 83–72 win over AP No. 2 Ohio State, who were previously unbeaten. On February 2, she had 42 points, eight assists and seven rebounds in a 96–82 victory over Maryland. On February 26, Clark recorded 34 points, nine rebounds and nine assists, making a game-winning three-pointer at the buzzer, in an 86–85 win against AP No. 2 Indiana. At the end of the regular season, she repeated as Big Ten Player of the Year in a unanimous vote and was named first-team All-Big Ten by the league's coaches and media.

Clark led Iowa to its second consecutive Big Ten tournament championship, where she earned MOP honors. In the title game, she recorded 30 points, 17 assists and 10 rebounds in a 105–72 win over Ohio State, the first triple-double in the final of the tournament. Clark moved to second in Division I history behind Sabrina Ionescu with her 10th career triple-double. She repeated as an AP and USBWA first-team All-American, with the AP selection being unanimous, and was named by CSC as its 2023 Academic All-American of the Year.

National team career
Clark represented the United States at the 2017 FIBA Under-16 Women's Americas Championship in Buenos Aires, Argentina. She came off the bench and averaged 8.8 points per game, helping her team achieve a 5–0 record and win the gold medal. Clark played at the 2019 FIBA Under-19 Women's Basketball World Cup in Bangkok, Thailand. In seven games, she averaged 5.3 points per game and won another gold medal, as her team finished with a 7–0 record. Clark competed at the 2021 FIBA Under-19 Women's Basketball World Cup in Debrecen, Hungary and led the United States to the gold medal. She averaged a team-high 14.3 points, 5.6 assists and 5.3 rebounds per game, was named Most Valuable Player and made the All-Tournament Team.

Career statistics

College

|-
| style="text-align:left;"| 2020–21
| style="text-align:left;"| Iowa
| 30 || 30 || 34.0 || .472|| .406 || .858 || 5.9 || 7.0 || 1.3 || .5 || 4.8 || bgcolor=lightgreen | 26.6
|-
| style="text-align:left;"| 2021–22
| style="text-align:left;"| Iowa
| 32 || 32 || 35.9 || .452 || .332 || .881 || 8.0 || bgcolor=lightgreen | 8.0 || 1.5 || .6 || 4.8 || bgcolor=lightgreen | 27.0'''

Off the court
Clark has been described by analysts as one of the most marketable college basketball players. On August 18, 2021, she signed her first name, image and likeness (NIL) deal with The Vinyl House, a company based in West Des Moines, Iowa. On October 27, she signed a deal with supermarket chain Hy-Vee. On March 1, 2022, H&R Block announced Clark as a participant in its "A Fair Shot" initiative to support women's college athletes. On July 26, she signed an NIL deal with Topps, which announced the release of trading cards for college athletes. Entering her junior season at Iowa, Clark signed a deal with Nike. During the 2023 NCAA tournament, she was one of five women's college basketball players featured in Buick's "See Her Greatness" campaign to improve women's visibility in sports.

See also
List of NCAA Division I women's basketball season scoring leaders
List of NCAA Division I women's basketball season assists leaders
List of NCAA Division I basketball career triple-doubles leaders

References

External links
 Iowa Hawkeyes bio

2002 births
Living people
All-American college women's basketball players
American women's basketball players
Basketball players from Des Moines, Iowa
Dowling Catholic High School alumni
Iowa Hawkeyes women's basketball players
McDonald's High School All-Americans
Point guards